Nafplia Province was one of the provinces of the Argolis Prefecture, Greece. Its territory corresponded with that of the current municipalities Nafplio and Epidaurus. It was abolished in 2006.

References

Provinces of Greece
Argolis